Muhammad Akhyar bin Abdul Rashid (born 1 May 1999) is a Malaysian professional footballer who plays as a winger for Malaysia Super League side Johor Darul Ta'zim and the Malaysia national team.

Early life
Born in Jitra, Kedah, Malaysia, Akhyar grew up playing football from a young age, stating previously his brothers participation in the sport encouraged him to play. He is also known as Mat Yat by Kedah fans.

Club career

Kedah
Akhyar first played and joined the Kedah youth academy when he was 15
years old. He was given  another change at Kedah first youth eleven. He spent time in Youth Cup played for Kedah Under-19. On 16 October 2017, he helped Kedah U-19 to win the first ever cup. In January 2015, he even had a month-long training stint with Cardiff City Academy in the United Kingdom.

On 4 March 2017, Akhyar made his first-team debut for 2017 season coming on as a substitute for Syazwan Zainon in the 80th minute of 4–0 win at Darul Aman. He scored his senior goals on 27 July 2017 in a Malaysia Cup match against Melaka United in victory win 6–2.

On 11 February 2018, Akhyar has scored his first goals on his 7th appearance for Kedah FA in the Malaysia Super League match against PKNP in a 0–1 win at Penang State Stadium.

Johor Darul Ta'zim
On 29 December 2018, Akhyar signed a contract with Johor Darul Ta'zim.

International career

Youth
Akhyar has represented Malaysia at all youth level from the under 16-side to the under-23 sides. He was a member of the Malaysia U17 in ASIAN Inter School Championship 2015 that took place in China in August 2015.

Akhyar was part of the national team  for the 2017 AFF U-18 Youth Championship that took place in Yangon, Myanmar. He scored 3 goals in 5 appearances during the matches. He has played in the final against Thailand which Malaysia lost 2–0. On 26 October 2017, Akhyar was selected to play in 2018 AFC U-19 Championship qualification in Paju, South Korea. Akhyar played a large role in the Malaysia under-19s during the qualification campaign. He scored 1 goals in 4 matches which confirmed Malaysia under-19s qualification to the 2018 AFC U-19 Championship for the first time in 11 years after finishing as one of the five best group runners-up. Akhyar was named in the Malaysia under 19 squad for 2018 AFF U-19 Youth Championship in the Indonesia. He has not played in the final against Myanmar which Malaysia win 4–3.

On 15 October 2018, he was named in the under-19 side for the 2018 AFC U-19 Championship.

Akhyar made 6 appearances in 2017 Southeast Asian Games for Malaysia U23. He has played in the final against Thailand which Malaysia lost 0–1 due to an own goal scored by Malaysian keeper Haziq Nadzli. On 23 November 2017, Akhyar has been enlisted in Malaysia U22's 30-man provisional squad for the 2018 AFC U-23 Championship and on 29 December 2017 he was selected to play at the tournament.

Akhyar was named in the 20-man Malaysia Squad for the 2018 Asian Games. On 15 August, Akhyar scored of Malaysia's goals in a 3–1 win over Kyrgyzstan.

Senior
In March 2018, Akhyar was called up to the Malaysian national team for the matches against Mongolia. On 22 March 2018, he earned his first international cap for Malaysia in the friendly match against Mongolia, coming on as a substitute for Mahali Jasuli in the 45th minute. In just his first appearance for Malaysia, Akhyar scored his first international goal in the match against Mongolia.

On 4 November 2018, he was named in the Malaysia national team for the 2018 AFF Championship.

In June 2019, Akhyar was named in the 23-man for the FIFA World Cup Qualifier against Timor-Leste which Malaysia won 7–1.

Career statistics

Club

International

International goals
''As of match played 1 June 2022. Malaysia score listed first, score column indicates score after each Akhyar Rashid goal.

Malaysia Under-23

Malaysia Under-19

Honours

Club
Kedah 
 Youth Cup: 2017
 Malaysia FA Cup: 2017
 Malaysia Cup runner-up: 2017

Johor Darul Ta'zim
Malaysia Charity Shield: 2019, 2020, 2021, 2022
Malaysia Super League: 2019, 2020, 2021
Malaysia Cup: 2019
 Malaysia FA Cup: 2022

International
Malaysia U-19
 AFF U-19 Youth Championship : 2018, runner-up: 2017

Malaysia U-23
 Southeast Asian Games
 Silver Medal: 2017
Malaysia
 AFF Championship runner-up: 2018
King's Cup runner-up: 2022

Individual
 Malaysia Football League Best Striker: 2018 
 Malaysia Football League Best Eleven: 2018, 2019
 Malaysia Football League Most Promising Player: 2019

Personal life
Akhyar's elder brother Rafdi Rashid was a former striker for Kedah. His older sister Nurrashidah Rashid currently a Malaysian national Sepak takraw player.

References

External links
 

1999 births
Living people
Malaysian footballers
Johor Darul Ta'zim F.C. players
Malaysia Super League players
People from Alor Setar
Malaysian people of Malay descent
Association football wingers
Southeast Asian Games silver medalists for Malaysia
Southeast Asian Games medalists in football
Footballers at the 2018 Asian Games
Competitors at the 2017 Southeast Asian Games
Asian Games competitors for Malaysia
Competitors at the 2019 Southeast Asian Games
Malaysia international footballers
Malaysia youth international footballers